Aberdeen Waterloo station opened on 1 April 1856 to serve the Great North of Scotland Railway main line to Keith. It was located on Waterloo Quay in the city centre. It closed to passengers in 1867 once  opened, but the track remains in use as a freight siding for the docks. The goods sheds were demolished in the 1960s, while the main station was converted for use as a storage facility.

References

Notes

Sources
 
 
 

Disused railway stations in Aberdeen
Former Great North of Scotland Railway stations
Railway stations in Great Britain opened in 1856
Railway stations in Great Britain closed in 1867
Former buildings and structures in Scotland
1867 disestablishments in Scotland